Sir Henry Spencer Hardtman Berkeley (6 September 1851 – 30 September 1918), was a barrister, Attorney General and Chief Justice of Fiji and Attorney-General of Hong Kong.

Early life

Berkeley was the third son of Thomas Berkeley Hardtman Berkeley and Alice Hart Rawlins, of St. Kitts.

He was educated for the legal profession and called to the bar at the Inner Temple in June 1873.

In 1878, Berkeley married Katherine Cassin, daughter of F. S. Cassin of Antigua in the West Indies. They had three children: Katharine Margaret, Marjorie, and Maurice Anthony.

Leeward Islands

Berkeley was admitted to the bar of the Leeward Islands in July 1874.  He filled various legal and official posts in the Leeward Islands. After acting as Attorney General in an interim capacity (1877–1878), he became Solicitor General from 1878 to 1883, when he became Acting Colonial Secretary.

Fiji
In 1885,  he was appointed Attorney General of Fiji in succession to Fielding Clarke who was appointed Chief Justice of Fiji and Chief Judicial Commissioner for the Western Pacific. As Attorney-General he acted as Chief Justice when Clarke was on leave. In 1889, he succeeded Clarke in both roles.  He acted for a brief time as Governor of Fiji.

Berkeley was knighted in the Queen's Birthday Honours of 20 May 1896.

Hong Kong
In what was seen as a slightly strange move from the bench back to the bar, in 1902, Berkeley accepted the position of Attorney-General for Hong Kong. In 1904 he was considered for the position of Chief Justice of Hong Kong on the retirement of W. Meigh Goodman.  Francis Piggott was appointed instead.  Berkeley acted as Chief Justice of Hong Kong on two occasions.

He was appointed a King's Counsel in Hong Kong in 1906.  He resigned as Attorney General in 1906 to enter full-time private practice.  William Rees-Davies took over the role in 1907.  Berkeley continued to practice in Hong Kong until 1912.  After retirement as attorney general, he continued to serve on the Hong Kong Legislative Council which he had been a member of as Attorney General. He also acted as Attorney General in 1909.

Berkeley also served as Chairman of the Hong Kong Volunteer Reserve Association, which consisted of men over 35 years of age.  The VRA's principal aim was the encouragement of rifle shooting.

Later life
After returning to England, he was a member of the West Sussex County Council from 1913.

Berkeley died on 30 September 1918 in England.

References

1851 births
1918 deaths
Attorneys General of Hong Kong
Chief justices of Fiji
Members of the Legislative Council of Hong Kong
Members of the Executive Council of Hong Kong
Members of West Sussex County Council
Hong Kong Queen's Counsel
Colony of Fiji judges
Attorneys General of the Colony of Fiji
Attorneys-general of Fiji
Attorneys General of the Leeward Islands
People from Saint Kitts
People from West Sussex
Ethnic minority Fijian politicians
Chief judicial commissioners for the Western Pacific
Chief secretaries (British Empire)
Knights Bachelor
Lawyers awarded knighthoods